Farnhill is a village and civil parish in the Craven district of North Yorkshire, England. Farnhill is also across the canal from Kildwick and there is a church in Kildwick. There is a primary school next to the church and Farnhill backs up on to the moors. There are around 500 people living in Farnhill.

To the south of the village is Farnhill Hall, a Grade I listed fortified manor house, dating from the 15th century but much altered.

References

External links

Villages in North Yorkshire
Civil parishes in North Yorkshire